Sam Todd (born 21 March 2003 in Leeds) is an English professional squash player. As of August 2021, he was ranked number 139 in the world. He won the 2021 Pontefract Men's Challenger.

References

2003 births
Living people
English male squash players